Amazon Coin is a digital payment method created by Amazon.com. Currently, the coins can only be used to purchase software and for microtransactions on apps downloaded from the Amazon Appstore on Kindle, Kindle Fire, and Android devices.

History
Amazon introduced Amazon Coins on July 13, 2013, in the United States and gave 500 free coins valued $5/£3 to all users of Kindle Fire devices, who could use the coins to purchase apps, games, and in-app purchases on the Amazon Appstore. However, in 2014, Amazon started allowing all Android users in Germany, the United Kingdom, and the United States to earn, buy, and spend Amazon Coins on the Appstore using Android phones and tablets. Users could also get discounts when they bought the coins in bulk and earn coins through certain apps on the Appstore.

In 2014, with the release of the Fire Phone, Amazon offered app developers 500,000 Amazon Coins for each paid app or app with in-app purchasing developed and optimized for the Fire Phone.

Function and value
Amazon has called Amazon Coins a "virtual currency". However, the Coins operate like other digital gift cards.

One Amazon Coin is worth one cent. However, like many coupons, they cannot be redeemed for cash. While you can gift other accounts Amazon Coins during the purchasing process, you cannot transfer coins that have already been added to an account.

Purchased Coins do not expire, but some promotional Coins expire just over one year from the date they are acquired.

When a customer buys software with Amazon Coins, the developer is paid in conventional currency.

References

Amazon (company)
Payment systems
Digital currencies